Mostki may refer to the following places:
Mostki, Kuyavian-Pomeranian Voivodeship (north-central Poland)
Mostki, Łódź Voivodeship (central Poland)
Mostki, Podlaskie Voivodeship (north-east Poland)
Mostki, Lesser Poland Voivodeship (south Poland)
Mostki, Subcarpathian Voivodeship (south-east Poland)
Mostki, Skarżysko County in Świętokrzyskie Voivodeship (south-central Poland)
Mostki, Staszów County in Świętokrzyskie Voivodeship (south-central Poland)
Mostki, Masovian Voivodeship (east-central Poland)
Mostki, Konin County in Greater Poland Voivodeship (west-central Poland)
Mostki, Ostrzeszów County in Greater Poland Voivodeship (west-central Poland)
Mostki, Lubusz Voivodeship (west Poland)
Mostki, Opole Voivodeship (south-west Poland)